Kwaza (also written as Kwazá or Koaiá) is an endangered Amazonian language spoken by the Kwaza people of Brazil. Kwaza is an unclassified language. It has grammatical similarities with neighboring Aikanã and Kanoê, but it's not yet clear if that is due to a genealogical relationship or to contact.

Little is known about Kwaza people and language due to the minimal historical sources available; if mentioned in reliable documents, it is usually in reference to its neighbors.  What is known, is that the Kwaza people were at one point a nation of a few thousand people, which could be subdivided into various groups.

The Kwaza language is threatened by extinction. In 2004, the language was spoken on a day-to-day basis by just 54 people living in the south of the state of Rondônia, Brazil. Of those 54, more than half were children, and half were trilingual, speaking Kwaza, Aikanã, and Portuguese, and some were bilingual, also speaking Portuguese. They live south of the original home of the Kwaza, on the Tuba Rao-Latundê indigenous reserve.

Classification
Van der Voort (2005) observes similarities among Kwaza, Kanoê, and Aikanã, but believes the evidence is not strong enough to definitively link the three languages together as part of a single language family. Hence, Kwaza is best considered to be a language isolate.

An automated computational analysis (ASJP 4) by Müller et al. (2013) also found lexical similarities between Kwaza and Aikanã. However, since the analysis was automatically generated, the grouping could be either due to mutual lexical borrowing or genetic inheritance.

Language contact
Jolkesky (2016) notes that there are lexical similarities with the Taruma, Arawak, Jeoromitxi, Arawa, Jivaro, Mura-Matanawi, Nambikwara, Peba-Yagua, Aikanã, and Kanoe language families due to contact.

Location

Historical 
The history of the Kwaza people is one marked with tragedy, which may contribute to why their language is endangered. in the 1960s, the Kwaza people lost many of their members due to the opening of the BR-364, an inter-state highway in Brazil connecting the southeast states to the western states. Today there are only about 40 individuals, Kwaza, Aikanã and Latunde peoples, who have been living together for a number of decades in the south of Rondônia. These peoples also lived in the state of Rondônia  and were also expelled from the fertile lands that they originally lived on, which may be why they live together now. The majority of the Kwaza have either been decimated or dispersed, and their culture destroyed by the national society which has been highly influenced by Western states. This may be the biggest conflict that the Kwaza people have faced, thus contributing to the endangerment and possible extinction of their language.

The traditional habitat of the Kwaza was the high forest in the Amazon, living and settling around rivers.

Due to the extremely limited documentation, combined with the semi-nomadic lifestyles of the Kwaza speakers and the lack of permanent settlements from a slash and burn agriculture, the historical location of the people is largely unknown. In addition, disease brought by Western contact and the imposed culture actively worked to destroy the local materials and societies.  However, according to oral tradition and sporadic instances of documentation, the Kwaza lived along the São Pedro and Taboca rivers in addition to along the headwaters of the Pimenta Bueno River.

Before contact with the "national society", the Kwaza held various rituals and activities. These included a several month isolation of young girls, anthropophagy, and the sport of head-ball. They decorated their bodies with shells, earrings, teeth, and painted their bodies with various dyes. Some of the Kwaza still plant bananas, manioc, peanuts, yams and tobacco. They also gather fruits and keep various types of animals such as monkeys, birds, and pigs as pets.

Modern Day 
In the modern day, speakers live on the indigenous reserve of Tubarão - Latundě.  This lies on the headwaters of Apediá or Pimento Bueno River, in the southeast of the federal Brazilian state of Rondônia.  Rondônia is part of the Guaporé region, the most diverse linguistic region of South America.  Over 40 indigenous languages can be found here, including 8 unique macro-families, and possibly 10 isolates.  Kwaza is therefore set in extreme linguistic diversity.  However, like Kwaza, most of the languages here are endangered with extinction and are poorly documented.

Neighbors, Invaders, and Scientist Interactions

Neighbors and Invaders
The Kwaza people neighbored the Mekens/Sakurabiat, the Tupari, Aikanã and the Kanoê, both with unclassified languages, the Salamai of the Monde language family, and various others, several of which have gone extinct. Despite all the contact that the Kwaza people may have had with other indigenous peoples, Kwaza language not have a great amount of similarities to any other indigenous language. In fact, the Guapore region (where the Kwaza people lived), is known as one of the most linguistically diverse regions of South America, with numerous language families represented such as Tacana, Tupi, Pano, as well as ten unclassified languages, one of which is Kwaza.

The most prominent neighbors of Alaina people groups lived along Tanaru tributary, 20 km south, but all the groups in the area formed alliances across linguistic borders. The first contact with Euro-Americans is hypothesized to have been around the mid 16th century from Spanish expeditions.  The middle of the 17th century offered Jesuit missionaries in Northeast Bolivia.  A relationship of avoidance developed between Portuguese and indigenous people, flaring to hostility in cases of contact.

The 19th century rubber boom caused non-Indians to settle permanently in Rondônia, and the posture of avoidance and indifference turned into one of enslavement for the Kwaza people.  The effects of this are seen in the turn of the language towards the Euro-Americans.  Increased contact also caused detrimental epidemics among the indigenous populations. Occasionally the native groups believed the cause of the epidemics were instigated by sorcery of other tribes, which caused violent clashes between the groups and further dwindled numbers to the extreme.

When the highway B-364 opened, impoverished Brazilians, logging companies, and cattle ranchers infiltrated the area and forced the indigenous people off the best lands and onto reserves, further encouraging them to let go of their native language. By 2004, the indigenous population barely hits 5,000 out of a total population of 1.5 million.

Language

Language Family 
Kwaza is referred to as an isolate, however, it is truer to refer to it as an unclassified language. Research has not been able to prove Kwaza's connection to any other language, but there have been attempts to identify possible linguistic relationships with unclassified neighboring languages. Kanoê and Aikanã, neighboring languages of Kwaza, appear to have classifiers, a trait they share with Kwaza. 

Kwaza shares the inclusive vs exclusive distinction in subject reference with Tupi languages. The most striking evidence of Kwaza possibly being related to languages in the area is lexical. The long history of contact between the peoples of Rondônia has caused cultural similarities and the occurrence of linguistic similarities. Van der Voort, in a paper submitted to the Leiden Research School, demonstrated similarities between Kwaza, Kanoê, and Aikanã (all three unclassified) with the Tupari Languages Akuntsu, Koaratira and Mekens.

Documentation History 
Before 1995, data on Kwaza was not properly gathered and analyzed. Knowledge on its grammar did not exist in written form. Outside of its native speakers, lexical knowledge from early scientists and explorers of the Rondônia  territory did not exist. The first documentation of the Kwaza people was made in 1913 by Candido Rondon because of his expeditions with telegraph lines in areas of Rondônia. In the 1930s, the first written sources of Kwaza words were taken by Claude Levi-Strauss, an anthropologist. Levi-Strauss was on a reconnaissance expedition documented words on standardised enquiry forms developed for this purpose. 

The standardised forms used allowed for easy lexical comparisons between different languages explorers encountered. Levi-Strauss's 1938 glossary is the oldest source of data from Kwaza and is available in van der Voort's book. The glossary contained fifty-one French words with their equivalent in Kwaza. In 1942, Lieutenant Estanislau Zack created a 222-comparative word list of four languages, including Kwaza. Kwaza was forgotten until Harvey Carlson rediscovered the language in 1984. The third recorded documentation of Kwaza was taken as an unpublished word-list by Carlson. During linguistic fieldwork as an M.A. student from Berkley, he took down fifty Kwaza words, which is available in "A Grammar of Kwaza". The present description of Kwaza is the result of Carlson's word list, as he brought the language to the attention of the linguistic world.

Linguist Hein van der Voort's involvement in the Netherlands Organization for Scientific Research (NOW) in 1994 led to the first modern grammar of Kwaza. In his book "A Grammar of Kwaza", Van der Voort presented the first descriptive grammar of the language. The descriptive grammar included phoneme inventory describing the oral vowels, nasal vowels, and place of articulation. Van der Voort provides a complex description of the vowels, with descriptions on minimal pairs, contextual pairs and variation. Consonants were also recorded with their matching IPA transcriptions, places of articulation, and classification. He provides an interpretation of glides, descriptive rules of syllable structure, stress, length, and intonation. Kwaza loan phonology is described with examples. A comprehensive section on parts of speech of Kwaza is available with information on noun phrases, verb phrases, types of morphemes, and word order. Van der Voort includes texts of tales translated from Kwaza to English to bring attention to Brazilian indigenous culture in an effort to preserve it. These texts include traditional tales, historical personal accounts, modern personal accounts, and translated songs. The last section of van der Voort's book is a dictionary of Kwaza to English. Hein van der Voort's work on the language has given the Kwaza the ability to preserve the language through making it available for others to learn, including non-indigenous people.

Phonology 

Kwaza has eight oral and seven nasal vowel phonemes, which are all attested in a minimal pair set, despite the rare /œ/ occurrence. The consonant inventory consists of 19 phonemes.

Vowels 

 /a/ can sometimes be heard as [ɑ] when before back vowels /u, ɔ/.
 /ɛ/ can also be heard as [æ] free variation.
 /ɘ/ can be heard as [ɨ̞] in free variation, as [ə] in unstressed position, or as a glide [ɨ̯] in syllable-final position. /ɘ̃/ can be heard as [ɨ̞̃] in free variation.
 /œ/ can be heard as [œ̈] in free variation.

Consonants 

 Implosives /ɓ, ɗ/ can also be heard as voiced plosives [b, d] in free variation.
 /h/ can be heard as voiced [ɦ] in intervocalic positions.
 /w, ɾ, j/ are nasalized as [w̃, ɾ̃, j̃] within nasal vowels.
 Sounds /s̠̺, w/ are heard as [ɕ, w̜] before front vowels.

Morphology

Personal Pronoun System
Kwaza personal pronouns:

Examples:

Parts of Speech 
Kwaza has four parts of speech: particles, verbs, adverbs, and nouns. No adjectives occur in the language. In Kwaza, the majority of the bound grammatical morphemes are suffixes. Kwaza is morphologically complex in its verbs. Word order is relatively free, but SOV and SVO are more dominant. In the language, it is mandatory to inflect verbs to express mood and subject person. First and second person singular are distinguished by subject agreement marking, as are first person inclusive and exclusive, and the second persona plural. The third person is not pronounced. There is no difference between third person singular and plural, or between feminine and masculine.

Pro-Drop Language 
Hein van der Voort (2000) categorizes Kwaza as a 'pro-drop' language because subject agreement is obligatory, while pronominal reference is optional. Definite argument morphemes can agree with explicit lexical arguments, but overt pronouns have a contrastive effect by emphasizing them.

Verb Morphology 
Verb morphology in Kwaza can express numerous moods. These moods include exhortative, interrogative, declarative, imperative, and negative. The imperative only happens with second person subjects. The second person singular usually has no expression. There are several verbal-final elements in Kwaza, which exist as subordinate clause mood markers. In adverbial clause construction, subordinate clause mood markers are used, for example in concessive and conditional clauses. The same object and subject morphemes are used, while the third person is not expressed. There is also a semantically abstract 'mood' marker used to connect clauses that are both coordinated and subordinated.

Verb Derivation 
Verbal derivation in Kwaza includes valency and valency change, negation, modality, aspect, and tense which are marked with various optional verbal morphemes. Some modality morphemes, according to van der Voort, could be grammatically related to mood markers. Verbs can be turned into adverbs or nouns through stem-final nominalizing morphemes. Kwaza has two subdivisions of derivational morphemes, directional and classifiers. While verb morphology in Kwaza is complex, nominal morphology is not. Kwaza has no gender or number inflection. Nouns can have animate object case marking. They can also have one of the oblique case markers: beneficiary, locative, comitative, and instrumental. Nouns are turned into verbs through attaching mood marking. As mentioned, Kwaza does not have adjectives.

Nouns and Classifiers 
Attributive modification of nouns occurs by comparing them with other nouns. Kwaza also has many classifying morphemes that only 'agree' with specific nouns. Classifiers are used widely. They can be used in verb stems, attach to bare nouns, and also modify adverbs. Classifiers are used in the position of nominalizers. Classifiers in Kwaza support van der Voorts statement of the language being pro-drop as they have functions similar to the functions of verbal agreement morphemes. These properties of classifiers rely heavily on the environment in which they are used, and according to van der Voort are not as dynamic as the properties of cross-reference morphemes. In complex nominalized clauses, specific classifiers cannot replace the nominalizer.

Morphological Aspect: Morpheme -ry- 
In the Kwaza language, the morpheme -ry- is used to describe a grammatical number for words in contexts where a few of their referents are described or referred to, also known as paucal. In both nouns and verbs of Kwaza, the morpheme -ry- is associated with paucal number, but does not occur in word-final position, and is always followed by a nominaliser (formation of a noun from a verb or adjective).

For example:

It is also important to note that the paucal morpheme -ry- applies only to humans and animals in Kwaza. For example:

Negation Morpheme -he- 
In Kwaza, the morpheme -he- is one of the negation morphemes, which creates the negative in predicates and propositions when bound together. In this negation morpheme, the negative usually comes before the person and mood marking. For example:

However, if the clause in the sentence is declarative, and there is no clear argument cross-reference, the declarative mood marker is -tse. For

example:

Reduplication

Reduplication in the language is very common, and occurs in many contexts, some of which include lexical roots, constituent syllables of roots, verbal person inflections and other parts of morphemes. In Kwaza, reduplication can also represent a past tense construction, if the person cross-reference morpheme is reduplicated. This is particularly interesting since in the Kwaza language, there is zero specific marking of past and present. An example of this is shown here:

Whereas something involving pain in the present tense would take this form:

In these examples, we see the reduplication of the first person singular, which in the language presents a first person past tense state. Another form of reduplication is root reduplication, which occurs with the repetition of the entire root which can occur with repetitive, progressive, durative and intensifying meaning which is attested both with verbal and adverbial roots . For example:

There is also another way in the Kwaza language where reduplication occurs to intensify meaning. Repetition of a syllable of the lexical root may also occur with repetitive and intensifying meaning, oftentimes it is the first syllable which is reduplicated:

Syllable Structure 
All syllables in Kwaza are vowel-final and generally adhere to the /(C)V/ syllable structure.  The exceptions occur in glides and glottal stops.  Any syllables that could begin with a vowel instead are preceded by a voiceless glottal stop.

Basic Word Classes and Order
Since the language  is so morphologically complex it is often described as a non-configurational language.  The flexibility in word order is possible due to almost every word in the sentence having case inflection.  However, generally the structures are head-final, with SVO (Subject-Verb-Object) being most common in instances of two over arguments.  Otherwise, both SV and OV occur frequently.

Case and Agreement 
Van der Voort, in his "Grammar of Kwaza", states that in Kwaza, there is no required morphological distinction in how pronouns and nouns function as objects and subjects. However, in certain cases, case inflection of nouns occurs. There is one case van der Voort describes a syntactic government relation between verb and argument. The suffix -wã conveys this case, which is called the "animate object" case. Kwaza displays a small number of "oblique" or "local" case markers which display semantic relations amongst verbs and possible nominal satellites. The suffix -ko expresses "instrumental" case, -na expresses "locative", -dynỹ expresses "comitative" and -du expresses "beneficiary".

Animate Object -wã 
In some transitive verbs, specific animate non-subjects of verbs are marked by -wã. -wã is applied under situations not completely understood. What is known is - wã often places stress on the animate non-subjects. -wã is necessary for most verbs with animate nouns that have a direct object function:

Other than elucidating which animate argument is the object, -wã also disambiguates the subject from the object. It is especially useful when they are both third person arguments:

-wã is not always necessary to differentiate between object and subject, because verbal cross-reference obligatorily expresses the subject. For first and second person, subject cross-reference is not zero, but it is in third person. Even though cross-reference agreement is enough to distinguish subjects and objects, -wã is still obligatory in some cases:

Without -wã, syntactic ambiguity occurs. But in cases with differences in animacy, no semantic-pragmatic ambiguity occurs. This can be seen in the following third person examples of an animate subject and inanimate object:

Transitivised Verbs 
When verbs with the transitivising morpheme -ta- occur with animate objects, they must be marked with -wã:

When the causative -dy is attached to intransitive verbs, they are transitivised. In these cases only animate objects are marked:

Ditransitive Verbs 
The indirect object is usually marked in common ditransitive verbs while the animate object is unmarked:

Verbs Which Contain Classifiers 
If transitive verbs with animate objects have classifying morphemes, -wã is also attached. This occurs if the classifier added to the verb stem and when it is not:

In Kwaza, objects of transitive verbs are usually case marked because they are of the animate category. Case marking becomes ungrammatical when they are inanimate. Case marking is not required to differentiate the object from the subject. The subject can be identified through cross-reference marking on the verb. This changes if all arguments are in third person, when arguments are in third person there can be ambiguity. Without case marking, on the basis of syntax alone, there is no way to distinguish third person animate subjects and objects. Case marking is obligatory with transitive verbs have arguments that are the same in person and animacy. -wã- has two functions: it marks objecthood and animacy.

Locative -na 
In Kwaza, the case ending -na expresses the sense of "in". -na can be used as a general marked to express several locational senses such as: "under, from, into", etc. -na is often seen with verbs that have a directional suffix:

Instrumental -ko 
-ko is used to mark nouns that function as an instrumental argument verbs:

Beneficiary -du 
-du marks beneficiary arguments:

Comitative -dynỹ 
- dynỹ marks comitative arguments. The matrix verb may be intransitive or transitive.

Vocabulary

Loukotka (1968)
Loukotka (1968) lists the following basic vocabulary items for Koaiá.

{| class="wikitable"
! gloss !! Koaiá
|-
| head || i-soteː
|-
| ear || gasí
|-
| tooth || miki
|-
| hand || enurí
|-
| woman || etál
|-
| water || há
|-
| fire || í
|-
| stone || akí
|-
| maize || achechí
|-
| tapir || aruín
|}

For a more extensive vocabulary list of Kwazá by Manso (2013), see the corresponding Portuguese article.

Plant and animal names
Selected Kwazá plant and animal names from Manso (2013):

{| class="wikitable sortable"
! Kwazá !! Scientific name !! Portuguese common name
|-
| dɨisa || Acrocinus sp. || besouro-arlequim
|-
| pororai || Ageratum conyzoides || erva-de-São-João
|-
| huri || Agouti paca || paca
|-
| tamũkɨ || Alouatta seniculus || guariba
|-
| wero || Amazona ochrocephala || papagaio-estrela
|-
| wãtsĩ || Amazona farinosa || papagaio-caboclo
|-
| hɛ || Amburana cearensis || cerejeira
|-
| urumãinwa || Anacardium occidentale || cajueiro
|-
| açɨhi || Anadenanthera peregrina || paricá
|-
| husisi || Andropogon sp. || sapé
|-
| temũ || Anostomus sp., Leporinus sp., Schizodon sp. || piau
|-
| ausisiti || Aotus nigriceps || macaco-da-noite
|-
| mama || Apeiba sp. || pau-mole
|-
| jẽjẽkɨdɨ || Apis mellifera || abelha
|-
| owɨtikje || Apuleia sp. || garapa
|-
| kumada sikilo || Apteronotus albifrons || ituí-cavalo
|-
| tjẽrĩ || Arachis hypogaea || amendoim
|-
| nãrãku || Aramides cajanea || saracura
|-
| hoi uruhu || Artibeus sp. || morcego-grande
|-
| dudukerũ || Astrocaryum gynacanthum || mumbaca
|-
| wadɛ || Astrocaryum tucuma || tucumã
|-
| hadutu || Astrocaryum murumuru || murumuru
|-
| erihi || Astyanax sp. || piabão
|-
| hɨrikoro || Ateles belzebuth || coata, macaco-preto
|-
| darija || Atelocynus microtis || cachorro-do-mato
|-
| tsilɛmãi || Atta spp. || saúva
|-
| mẽsĩ || Attalea maripa || inajá
|-
| tjokoru || Attalea phalerata || bacuri
|-
| kuricɨi || Attalea speciosa || babaçu
|-
| daritjoha || Avicularia spp. || caranguejeira
|-
| hakuku || Bactris gasipaes || pupunha
|-
| dudu || Bactris spp. || marajá
|-
| hãçɨi, mãbi; nũrũrũ, wesi || Bambusa spp. || taquara
|-
| kũtjẽ || Bertholletia excelsa || castanha-do-Pará
|-
| toro || Bixa orellana || urucu
|-
| takwanarẽtʃa || Boa constrictor, Epicrates cenchria || jiboia
|-
| merumeru || Bombus spp. || abelha
|-
| tsutu || Bothrops spp. || jararaca
|-
| tauta || Bradypus variegatus || preguiça-de-bentinho
|-
| humu || Brosimum acutifolium || mururé
|-
| hĩtsã || Brosimum sp. || amapá
|-
| araka || Bryconops sp. || piabão
|-
| ãkãki || Bufo marinus || sapo-cururus
|-
| kurukuru || Bufo marinus || sapo de cor preta
|-
| (wɨ̃wɨ̃kurjo) || Buteogallus urubitinga || gavião
|-
| kɨrɨmujã || Byrsonima crassifolia || murici
|-
| dakainwã || Caesalpinia spp. || pau-brasil
|-
| hatsi; manariçu || Calathea spp. || arumã
|-
| wãrũwãrũ || Callicebus moloch || zogue-zogue
|-
| mĩtjẽ || Callithrix argentata || sauim-branco
|-
| wakaro || Caluromys philander || mucura-xixica
|-
| kaka || Camponotus femoratus || formiga
|-
| hade || Capsicum spp. || pimenta
|-
| ukesĩ || Caryocar glabrum || pequiarana
|-
| ukenũ || Caryocar villosum || pequiá
|-
| hɨri || Cebus apella || macaco-prego
|-
| watsirai || Cecropia spp., Pourouma spp. || imbaúba
|-
| tukutɛ; tʃaja || Cedrela fissilis || cedro
|-
| kaka-sikikoko || Cephalotes atratus || formiga
|-
| darija-tʃũhũi || Cerdocyon thous || raposa
|-
| husi-hãnãɨ̃hɨ̃ || Chironectes minimus || cuíca, mucura-d'água
|-
| hiribɛɁɨ̃hɨ̃; hɨrikoro-bɛʔĩhɨ̃ || Chiropotes albinasus || macaco-cuxiú
|-
| baɨtsɨtõi; çɨinitõi || Citrus aurantifolia || limão
|-
| doi; duma || Clelia clelia || muçurana
|-
| hudai || Clusia spp. || apuí
|-
| açu || Coendou prehensilis || cuandu
|-
| terai || Columba cayennensis || pomba-galela
|-
| makuitʃato || Columba speciosa || pomba-pedrês
|-
| huhu || Columbina spp. || rolinha
|-
| deda-wãsĩ || Corallus spp. || cobra
|-
| mũli || Crotophaga sp. || anu
|-
| jũtsĩ || Crypturellus soui || inambu
|-
| tsĩ || Crypturellus strigulosus || inambu
|-
| utetaɨ || Crypturellus strigulosus || inambu
|-
| darɨro || Cucurbita sp. || abóbora-do-mato
|-
| kurukuru || Dactylomys dactylinus || rato-toró
|-
| kataɨ || Dasyprocta spp. || cutia
|-
| harurai || Dasypus kappleri || tatu-quinze
|-
| haru || Dasypus novemcinctus || tatu-galinha
|-
| kaçanuje || Davilla rugosa || cipó-de-fogo
|-
| nãĩ || Dermatobia hominis || larva de mosca
|-
| husi || Didelphis marsupialis || mucura
|-
| taramãçu, uitsi || Dinoponera gigantea || tocandira
|-
| mouru || Dryocopus lineatus, Campephilus spp. || pica-pau-grande
|-
| çuruatũi || Duranta erecta || creolim
|-
| itjorɨ; karuto || Eciton sp. || formiga
|-
| hure || Eira barbara || irara
|-
| kɨrɨjaje || Electrophorus electricus || poraquê
|-
| tekoretɛ || Erythrinus erythrinus || acarapuru
|-
| deda-hãnãɨ̃hɨ̃ || Eunectes murinus || sucuri, sucuriju
|-
| kaikuri || Euphractus sexcinctus || tatu-peba
|-
| wiriɁu || Euterpe oleracea || açaí
|-
| owɨ || Genipa americana || jenipapo
|-
| kẽwẽ-kiʔɨ̃hɨ̃ || Geochelone carbonaria || jabuti-piranga
|-
| kẽwẽ || Geochelone denticulata || jabuti-amarelo
|-
| tsotsinijẽ; tsotsinĩnjẽ || Gossypium spp. || algodão
|-
| apara çukurje || Heliconia hirsuta || bico-de-guará
|-
| kitsoroi || Hemidactylus mabouia || osga-de-casa
|-
| tai-açɨnaɨ̃hɨ̃ || Hemidactylus mabouia || osga-de-casa
|-
| tsiloto || Hevea spp. || seringueira
|-
| haçɛ || Heteropsis jenmanii || cipó-titica
|-
| tekore || Hoplerythrinus unitaeniatus || jeju
|-
| çunũtε || Hoplias sp. || traíra
|-
| sikitje || Hoplosternum spp. || tamboatá
|-
| jara || Hydrochaeris hydrochaeris || capivara
|-
| manini-jereçwa || Hydrolycus sp. || peixe-cachorro
|-
| ukato || Hyla boans || perereca
|-
| kẽinjũ || Hymenaea courbaril || jatobá
|-
| kẽitjakwe || Hymenaea sp. || jatobá-mirim
|-
| tai ekũkũtɛ || Iguana iguana || camaleão
|-
| tjukwe || Inga spp. || ingá
|-
| tjaɨ || Jacaratia sp., Carica papaya || jaracatiá
|-
| ĩtsãi || Lachesis mutus || surucucu
|-
| kudɨ; kudɨkãi || Lagenaria siceraria || cabaça
|-
| hɨrikoro-haɁɨ̃hɨ̃ || Lagothrix lagotricha || macaco-barrigudo
|-
| ururitsunwã; ururitsunwɨ̃ || Lantana sp. || cambará-rosa
|-
| jereçwa-erereɁɨ̃hɨ̃ || Leopardus pardalis || maracajá-açu
|-
| wɨitsitsu || Leopardus wiedii || maracajá-peludo
|-
| huwa || Leptodactylus pentadactylus || mãe-da-chuva
|-
| huhukɨ || Leptodactylus stenodema || mãe-de-chuva
|-
| kuikuijo || Lipaugus vociferans || cricrió-seringueiro
|-
| beçɨi || Lonchocarpus nicou || timbó
|-
| mãtete || Lontra longicaudis || lontrinha
|-
| jo || Manihot utilissima || mandioca
|-
| manakuʔɨi || Manilkara huberi || massaranduba
|-
| hakare || Mauritia flexuosa || buriti
|-
| aɁũ-kiɁĩhi || Mazama americana || veado-mateiro
|-
| aɁũ-tʃuhũi || Mazama gouazoupira || veado-catingueiro
|-
| tʃikere || Melanerpes cruentatus || pica-pau-negro
|-
| terei || Mitannis sp. || pacu-prata
|-
| heçunwã || Mezilaurus itauba || itaúba
|-
| tsjatoro || Micrurus spp. || cobra
|-
| perjutsjenju || Muscivora tyrannus || tesourinha
|-
| asitsu || Myrmecophaga tridactyla || tamanduá, tamanduá-bandeira
|-
| kihãrẽ || Myroxylon balsamum || cabreúva
|-
| haduru || Nasua nasua || quati
|-
| tu || Nectarina lecheguana || enxu
|-
| bɨbɨtsu || Odontomachus chelifer, Paraponera clavata || tocandira
|-
| uruçeçu || Oenocarpus bacaba || bacaba
|-
| uru || Oenocarpus bataua || patauá
|-
| kãrãwɨto || Ormosia arborea || mulungu
|-
| kotorε || Osteocephalus taurinus || perereca
|-
| hudi; tjutjutjudɨtsahã || Otus spp., Ciccaba spp. || corujinha
|-
| ĩtsẽ; jereçwa || Panthera onca || onça-pintada
|-
| hoitswatũ; jukare || Passiflora spp. || maracujá
|-
| çitɨi || Pediculus spp. || piolho
|-
| wã-tʃihɨ̃tɛ || Pepsis sp. || marimbondo-caçador
|-
| hariɁiçu || Phaseolus spp. || feijão
|-
| hedaka || Phenakospermum guyannense || sororoca
|-
| baɨkaloɨi || Philodendron goeldii || cipó-ambé
|-
| hakoro || Phlebotomus spp. || tatuquira
|-
| wãwã || Phrynohyas resinifictrix || cunauaru
|-
| koko || Phyllomedusa spp. || perereca
|-
| purutʃa || Physalis spp. || camapu
|-
| uhu tʃihĩtɛ; uhu-tʃũhũi || Pilherodius pileatus || garça-real
|-
| tanã || Pilocarpus sp. || jaborandi
|-
| tsɨitsu || Pimelodus spp., Pimelodella sp. || mandi
|-
| dururu || Pithecia monachus || parauacu, macaco-cabeludo
|-
| çoçoto || Platonia sp., Rheedia spp. || bacuri
|-
| tai tsjõ || Plica umbra, Anolis fuscoauratus || papa-vento
|-
| kẽwẽdori || Podocnemis unifilis || tracajá
|-
| sakarũ || Potamotrygon spp. || arraia
|-
| kutʃikutʃi || Potos flavus || jupará
|-
| hakuçu || Pourouma cecropiaefolia || cucura
|-
| hakuçu || Pourouma cecropiaefolia || uva-do-mato
|-
| mĩdo || Pouteria pariry || pariri
|-
| mãtja || Pouteria spp. || abiurana
|-
| çoronã || Priodontes giganteus || tatu-canastra
|-
| owɨto || Pseudolmedia laevigata || pama
|-
| çoro || Pseudomyrmex spp. || taxi
|-
| maninitɛ || Pseudoplatystoma fasciatum || surubim
|-
| aratsabi || Psophia crepitans || jacamim
|-
| jereçwa-kiɁɨ̃hɨ̃ || Puma concolor || onça-vermelha
|-
| bibitjenju || Ramphocelus carbo || pipira
|-
| jakukurɛ || Ricinus communis || mamona
|-
| bɨrɨrɨtũi || Rollinia mucosa || biribá
|-
| baha || Saimiri sciureus || macaco-de-cheiro
|-
| tʃãrãiçu || Sinan spp. || perereca
|-
| hatemã; hotemã || Sciurus spadiceus, Sciurus aestuans || esquilo
|-
| winɨkalo || Scleria spp. || tiririca
|-
| eri || Serrasalmus hollandi || piranha-pintada
|-
| eri hohoɨ̃hɨ̃ || Serrasalmus rhombeus || piranha-preta
|-
| dore; katsutsu || Sylvilagus brasiliensis || coelho
|-
| takanasi; takanãsinwɨ̃ || Simaba cedron || quina
|-
| kamũkamũ || Simarouba amara || cacheta
|-
| çu || Synbranchus marmoratus || muçum
|-
| tɛte || Simulium spp. || pium
|-
| wɨçɨi || Socratea exorrhiza || paxiúba
|-
| paira || Solanum spp. || jurubeba
|-
| ehe || Solenopsis sp. || formiga
|-
| hudi-tsãrãnãhĩ || Speotyto cunicularia sp. || coruja-do-campo
|-
| kaihũhẽ || Spilotes pullatus || caninana
|-
| haku || Spondias mombin || taperebá
|-
| hurerai || Swietenia macrophylla || mogno
|-
| murɨtjɨ; tʃeja || Swietenia sp. || cedro-lagoano
|-
| nanaɁũ || Tabebuia sp. || pau-d'arco
|-
| çoronwã || Tachigali sp. || taxi
|-
| sirisiri || Tamandua tetradactyla || mambira
|-
| ãrũi || Tapirus terrestris || anta
|-
| duture || Tayassu pecari || queixada
|-
| hajere || Tayassu tajacu || caititu
|-
| purukui || Terminalia brasiliensis || mirindiba
|-
| tai-marɛɁa || Thecadactylus rapicaudus || osga
|-
| ereto || Theobroma cacao || cacau
|-
| atʃitʃiɁũɨi || Tineola uterella || traça
|-
| terei hohoɨ̃hɨ̃ || Tometes sp. || pacu
|-
| çediçu || Tetragonisca angustula || abelha
|-
| haço || Trigona spinipes || abelha
|-
| çatɨ || Oxytrigona tataira || abelha
|-
| hakai || Trigona trinidadensis || avô
|-
| çɨitjo || Tunga penetrans || bicho-de-pé
|-
| hãkoɁɛ || Tupinambis merianae || teju, jacuraru
|-
| marɛʔa-ekasiɛ || Tyto alba || rasga-mortalha
|-
| çudẽrẽ || Urera sp. || urtiga
|-
| nuhai || Vanellus chilensis || quero-quero
|-
| hakũĩtsĩ || Vernonia ferruginea || assa-peixe
|-
| kumada || Vicia faba || fava
|-
| huhuri || Xanthosoma sagittifolium || taioba
|-
| mĩkarẽ || Xanthosoma sagittifolium || taioba
|-
| dihu || Xylopia nitida || embira-amerela
|}

References

Further reading

 
 

Indigenous languages of South America
Languages of Brazil
Endangered language isolates
Language isolates of South America
Mamoré–Guaporé linguistic area